The Fajr-4 is an Iranian air-to-surface guided rocket that was first unveiled on 9 May 2020 through a video released by the IRGC Aerospace Force. In the video, the missile is seen undergoing a drop test from a Sukhoi Su-22 fighter-bomber. Videos released of Supreme Leader, Ayatollah Seyyed Ali Khamenei, paying a visit to an IRGC Aerospace Force suggest that Iran had already armed its Sukhoi Su-22's with a new air-to-surface missile.

Characteristics
The Artillery rocket has a caliber of 333 mm, uses command guidance and has maneuvering fins. The missile has two variants, Fajr-4 and Fajr-4CL. The IRGC has not provided further details of the missile.

References

21st-century surface-to-air missiles

Air-to-surface missiles of Iran
Fajr family of rockets
Guided missiles of Iran
Air-to-surface missiles
Weapons and ammunition introduced in 2020